Başbudak is a village in the Tercan District, Erzincan Province, Turkey. The village is populated by Kurds of the Abdalan tribe and had a population of 386 in 2021.

The hamlets of Alibeykomu, Esentepe, Harhurunkomu, Kesmetaş and Sağır are attached to the village.

References 

Villages in Tercan District
Kurdish settlements in Erzincan Province